Erick Chapa (born July 5, 1985 in Mexico City, Mexico), is a Mexican television actor.

Personal life 
He is married with the Mexican actress Alexa Martín, the wedding ceremony was held on 3 February 2017 at Hacienda La Escoba, in Jalisco. They both became parents on 25 October 2019, when their first child, whom they called Lorenzo, was born.

Filmography

References

External links
 

Living people
People educated at Centro de Estudios y Formación Actoral
1985 births
Mexican male telenovela actors
Mexican male television actors
21st-century Mexican male actors